Ariodante Fabretti (1 October 1816 – 15 September 1894) was an Italian archaeologist.

External link

People from Perugia
1816 births
1894 deaths
19th-century Italian people
Chevaliers of the Légion d'honneur
Italian archaeologists
Members of the Académie des Inscriptions et Belles-Lettres
University of Bologna alumni
Officers of the Order of Saints Maurice and Lazarus
Academic staff of the University of Turin
Directors of the Museo Egizio